Ahmed Ibn Abu al-Hussain al-Nuri (died 908 AD), known also as Nuri, was a famous early Sufi saint. He was of Persian origins, but born in Baghdad in 840 CE where spent most of his life. He is the author of Maqamat al-qulub (Stations of the Hearts). He is famous for saying, "I love God and God loves me". He is one of the earliest Sufis who was clearly mystical as illustrated by his saying "Joining with the Truth is parting from everything else, as parting with everything else is joining with it"

Nuri and several of his friends were accused of heresy and charged in 878 C.E. Nuri offered to be tried before his companions.  The regent at the time was impressed by such magnanimity and investigated the case and found these Sufis to be good Muslims.  Thus he set the accused free. Nuri, however, was exiled to Raqqa in Syria, whence he returned some years later, much deteriorated physically.

Poetry and statements from Nuri are narrated in popular Sufism.  According to popular accounts, he gained the title "Nuri" because he "radiated light when talking".  He was acquainted with Junayd Baghdadi.

Notes

Bibliography 
 Christopher Melchert: The Transition from Ascetism to Mysticism at the Middle of the Ninth Century, in: Studia Islamica 83 (1996), 51–70.

External links
 Nuri Bibliography

Iraqi Sufis
Iraqi Sufi saints
840s births
908 deaths